Coicoyan de Las Flores  is a town and municipality in Oaxaca in south-western Mexico. The municipality covers an area of 105.89 km² and is part of the Juxtlahuaca district of the Mixteca Region. As of 2005, the municipality had a total population of 7,598.

History
The foundation of this town is unknown for certain since there is no written record. Oral stories focus on a hill called El Gachupin. There,a Spanish force threatened general Vicente Guerrero who was in Ahuajutla's ranch helping his troops by using the metals from the mines of carbonera to coin money (from gold, copper and silver). He stayed and waited until the perfect opportunity arrived to attack the Spaniards in Azompa, taking advantage of darkness and letting them to destroy themselves. The next morning when they realized what had happened, they were shocked so the general Vicente Guerrero attacked them again and achieved victory, taking some prisoners with him to Xonacatlan camp where he had some other forces.

Orography
The mountain range that crosses through this town,  starts in San Pedro  el Viejo and ends in Atlamajalcingo del Monte, district of Morelos, getting into the state of Guerrero until joining sierra Madre del Sur.

Hydrography
The river that runs through this town flows from the hills of Metlatono through the fresh Zarzaparrilla, which purifies them and gives them a pleasant flavor and ends in the town of Tlapancingo, district of Silacayoapam.

References

Municipalities of Oaxaca